The High Denomination Bank Notes (Demonetisation) Act, 1978, of India is a law passed in the Indian Parliament, ceasing the usage of high-denomination bank notes of ₹1000, ₹5000, and ₹10000.
On 16 January 1978, the then President of India Neelam Sanjiva Reddy introduced the High Denomination Bank Notes (Demonetisation), Ordinance 1978. The then Prime Minister India, Morarji Desai of Janata Party, Finance Minister Hirubhai M. Patel, and Reserve Bank of India Governor I. G. Patel, are considered the key architects in the development and execution of the policy.

Preamble to the Demonetisation Act 1978

The Preamble to the Demonetisation Act 1978 highlights the need for demonetisation of high denominations, in the public interest. The usage of high-denomination bank notes was considered detrimental to the Economy of India, due to illegal financial transactions facilitated by high-denomination bank notes.

Opposition

The constitutional validity of 1978 Act of Demonetisation was challenged in the Supreme Court of India, on the claimed grounds that it violated the then Fundamental Right of property. The Constitutional bench of the Supreme Court of India rejected the petitioners' plea, and upheld the Constitutional validity of Demonetisation Act, 1978.

Passage in the Parliament

The Act was passed by consideration in both Houses of Parliament and supreme court, and was implemented by an issue of an ordinance on 16 January 1978, which was later made an Act, from 30 March 1978.

Details

The Demonetisation Act of 1978 has fifteen sections.

Section 2 details the usage of bank notes in Act.

Amendment

1998
Section 2 of the Act was amended in the winter session of Indian Parliament in 1998. Following a discussion in the 1998 winter session of Indian Parliament, the bill was introduced, by the then Finance minister Yashwant Sinha to reintroduce ₹1000 banknotes, due to claims of shortage of high-denomination notes and increasing pressure on lower denominations.

Related ordinance

The draft of the 1978 Demonetisation Ordinance was prepared by referring to the Demonetisation Ordinance of 1946.
On 12 January 1946, High Denomination Bank Notes (Demonetisation) Ordinance 1946 was passed by the then Governor General of India, Field Marshal Archibald Wavell, 1st Earl Wavell ceasing 500note , 1000note , and 10000 note to be legal tender.

Aftermath
The chief economic advisor of the State Bank of India affirmed that 25% of the proscribed currency notes did not return to the banking system during the 1978 demonetisation episode.

See also

2016 Indian banknote demonetisation
List of Acts of the Parliament of India

References

Acts of the Parliament of India 1978
Desai administration
Financial history of India